Metrocentre Interchange serves the Metrocentre in Gateshead. The bus station was originally constructed in the late 1980s, opened in 1987. In the early 2000s, the former bus station was demolished, with the current bus station opened in October 2004.

A footbridge connects Metrocentre Interchange with the railway station and coach park. Rail services from the station are operated by Northern Trains.

Metrocentre Interchange is served by Go North East and Stagecoach in Newcastle's bus services, with frequent routes running in and around Gateshead and Newcastle upon Tyne, as well as County Durham, North Tyneside and Northumberland. The bus station has 12 departure stands (lettered A–M), each of which is fitted with seating, next bus information displays, and timetable posters.

, the stand allocation is:

See also
 Metrocentre

References

External links

Bus stations in Tyne and Wear
Buildings and structures in Gateshead
1987 establishments in England
2004 establishments in England